Shogi (also called Shoghi)is a village located in Shimla district of Himachal Pradesh, India. The village is situated 15 km away from Shimla, district & sub-district headquarter of the village. According to 15th Indian Census the village has a total population of 1,256 peoples with 685 male population and 571 female population.
Shogi village is known as a village of temples.

Population

Tourism 
Located at 5873 feet above the sea level, Shogi village is a place of tourist attraction for Tara Devi Temple, Hanuman Temple, Kali Temple and others. Tourists can reach Shogi from Shimla and Kalka by boarding the Himalayan Queen. People also can travel via taxis and buses available from Shimla.

References 

Villages in Shimla district